Tamala may refer to:

People
Evie Tamala (born 1969), Indonesian dangdut singer-songwriter
Tamala Edwards (born 1971), American television news anchor and reporter
Tamala Jones (born 1974), American actress
Tamala Krishna Goswami (1946–2002), served on International Society for Krishna Consciousness's Governing Body Commission

Places
Tamala (inhabited locality), name of several inhabited localities in Russia
Tamala Park, Western Australia, unpopulated locality within the City of Wanneroo in Perth, Western Australia

Other
Tamala, a taxonomical synonym for Persea, a genus of evergreen trees
Tamala limestone, eolianite limestone deposits on the western coastline of Western Australia
Tamala 2010: A Punk Cat in Space, a Japanese anime feature film